Bertilia is a genus of flowering plants belonging to the family Asteraceae.

Its native range is South African Republic.

Species:
 Bertilia hantamensis (J.C.Manning & Goldblatt) Cron

References

Asteraceae
Asteraceae genera